Anna Jardeleza Luna-Alpuerto (born September 12, 1993) is a Filipino actress. She is best known for starring in Philippine art-house and independent films, notably Mike de Leon's  Citizen Jake,  Nerissa Picadizo's Requited,  and Chito Roño's Emir.

She was nominated best actress at the 2018 Philadelphia Independent Film Awards (PIFA) for her performance in the 2018 independent film Maestra (English title: An Educator).

Filmography

Television

Film

References 

Living people
Filipino film actresses
1993 births